Drozd ("thrush" in several Slavic languages) may refer to:
Drozd, anti-missile active protection system developed in the Soviet Union
Drozd BB rifle
Drozd (surname)